Anapoma is a genus of moths of the family Noctuidae.

Species
 Anapoma albicosta (Moore, 1881)
 Anapoma albivenata (Swinhoe, 1890)
 Anapoma chapa Hreblay & Yoshimatsu, 1999
 Anapoma complicata Hreblay, 1999
 Anapoma coronilla (Berio, 1973)
 Anapoma decoronata Hreblay, 1996
 Anapoma duplicata (Butler, 1889)
 Anapoma himacola Hreblay & Legrain, 1999
 Anapoma hyphilarioides Hreblay & Yoshimatsu, 1996
 Anapoma martoni Yoshimatsu & Legrain, 2001
 Anapoma nigrilineosa (Moore, 1882)
 Anapoma pallidior (Draudt, 1950)
 Anapoma postica (Hampson, 1905)
 Anapoma replicata Hreblay & Yoshimatsu, 1999
 Anapoma riparia (Boisduval, 1829)
 Anapoma unicorna (Berio, 1973)

References
 Anapoma at Markku Savela's Lepidoptera and Some Other Life Forms
 Natural History Museum Lepidoptera genus database

Mythimnini
Noctuoidea genera